The white-browed brushfinch (Arremon torquatus) is a species of bird in the family Passerellidae. It lives in northwestern Argentina, Bolivia, and southern Peru. It previously was considered the nominate subspecies of the stripe-headed brushfinch.

Taxonomy
Until recently, the white-browed brushfinch was placed in the genus Buarremon.

Considerable racial variation existed in the formerly named stripe-headed brushfinch, and based on ecology, morphology, song, and molecular work it was recently suggested that it be split into eight species.

References

 

white-browed brushfinch
Birds of the Northern Andes
white-browed brushfinch
white-browed brushfinch
white-browed brushfinch
Taxonomy articles created by Polbot